This is a list of current Labour Party and Labour Co-operative Members of Parliament (MPs) elected to the British House of Commons. The names in italics are the current Speaker and Deputy Speakers and the names with a * next to them are MPs who first entered Parliament in a by-election.

For a list of only Labour Party MPs, see List of United Kingdom Labour MPs 2005-; for a list of only Labour Co-operative MPs, see List of United Kingdom Labour Co-operative MPs 2005-.

 MPs 

See also
 Results of the 2005 United Kingdom general election
 List of MPs elected in the 2005 United Kingdom general election
 List of United Kingdom Labour MPs (2005–2010)
 List of United Kingdom Labour Co-operative MPs (2005–2010)
 List of United Kingdom Conservative MPs (2005–2010)
 List of United Kingdom Liberal Democrat MPs (2005–2010)
 List of MPs for constituencies in Northern Ireland (2005–2010)
 List of MPs for constituencies in Scotland (2005–2010)
 List of MPs for constituencies in Wales (2005–2010)
 Members of the House of Lords

Labour and Labour Co-operative
Current Labour and Labour Co-op